Kane Hodder was a hardcore/indie rock band formed in 2002, who also incorporates influences ranging from surf, 1960s soul, funk, and Latin lounge, among others.  They remained in Fueled by Ramen's alumni for some time, despite having left the label in 2006.

Around the same time, original band members Jeremy White and Nick Cates left the band.  They were replaced by Jerome Sauer and Aaron Yost, previously of the Kitsap County-based band Claymore.

The band is named after Stuntman actor Kane Hodder, best known for portraying Jason Voorhees in the Friday the 13th series. The band asked permission from Hodder before naming their band such, which he happily granted.

The band broke up in 2009. Their last show was December 19, 2009 in Seattle, Washington. Eric, Jerome and Aaron went on to form the post-hardcore band Grenades the same year.

On February 7, 2015 Kane Hodder played an unannounced secret show in Bremerton, WA as part of a surprise bachelor party.

Discography

References

External links
 Official Website

Musical groups from Washington (state)
Musical quintets